Off the record may refer to:

 Off the record (journalism), a communication that may not be publicly disclosed

Arts, entertainment, and media

Books
 Off the Record: The Private Papers of Harry S. Truman, a 1980 book edited by historian Robert Hugh Ferrell
 Off the Record: Picking Up the Pieces After Losing My Dream Job at the White House, a 2020 book by Madeleine Westerhout

Music

Albums
 Off the Record (Karl Bartos album), 2013
 Off the Record (Neil Innes album), 1982
 Off the Record (Sweet album), 1977
 Off the Record, by Paul van Dyk, 2022
 Off the Record, an EP by Jesse McCartney, 2005
 Off the Record, an EP by Torae, 2011

Songs
 "Off the Record" (My Morning Jacket song), 2005
 "Off the Record" (Tinchy Stryder song), 2011
 "Off the Record", a song written by George M. Cohan, appearing in the 1942 film Yankee Doodle Dandy
 "Off the Record", a song by Hieroglyphics from the album 3rd Eye Vision

Television
 Off the Record (TV series), a 1948 TV series starring Zero Mostel that lasted just 2 episodes on the DuMont network
 Girls Aloud: Off the Record, a 2006 reality television series starring pop group Girls Aloud
 Off the Record with Michael Landsberg, also known as Off the Record or OTR, a Canadian sports talk television show that aired on TSN

Other uses in arts, entertainment, and media
 Off the Record (film), a 1939 American film
Off the Record (play), a 1947 comedy by Ian Hay
 Dead Rising 2: Off the Record, a 2011 video game

Other uses
 Off the Record (charity), a mental health charity in Bristol, England
 Off-the-Record Messaging, an instant messaging encryption system

See also
 For the Record (disambiguation)
 On Record (disambiguation)
 On the Record (disambiguation)
 Record (disambiguation)
 Sub rosa